Louis Joseph de Lorraine Duke of Guise and Duke of Angoulême, (7 August 1650 – 30 July 1671) was the only son of Louis, Duke of Joyeuse and Marie Françoise de Valois, the only daughter of Louis-Emmanuel d'Angoulême, Count of Alès, Governor of Provence and son of Charles de Valois Duke of Angoulême, a bastard of Charles IX of France.

Biography

He was born at the Hôtel de Guise, present Hôtel de Soubise.

His mother having been confined to the abbey of Essay for "imbecility" (that is, mental illness), Louis Joseph was raised by his aunt and legal guardian, Marie de Lorraine, known as "Mademoiselle de Guise." Upon the death of his uncle Henry II, Duke of Guise, Louis Joseph succeeded him as head of the House of Guise. Mlle de Guise promptly ordered extensive renovations to the family's stately residence, known as the "Hôtel de Guise."

In October 1663, the young duke and his aunt were received in great pomp in his duchy of Joinville. He received an excellent education, under the guidance of Mlle de Guise's protégé, Philippe Goibaut, and his skills as a horseman were honed by François Roger de Gaignières, his écuyer.

On 15 June 1667, the young Duke married Élisabeth Marguerite d'Orléans, duchesse d'Alençon, daughter of Gaston, Duke of Orléans, at Saint-Germain-en-Laye. As she was a petite-fille de France, the marriage was considered a coup for the House of Guise, for the bridegroom was a mere prince étranger: Saint-Simon noted that she was a stickler for receiving the honours due her rank, even at the expense of her husband's dignity at the court of Louis XIV, inasmuch as he "was only entitled to a folding stool." Mademoiselle de Guise carefully trained her nephew to receive Italian nobles and ambassadors who were passing through Paris, and it doubtlessly was in order to add additional luster to the couple's little court that Mlle de Guise invited Marc-Antoine Charpentier to move into an apartment at the Hôtel de Guise and compose for the young couple's chapel.

The couple had one son:

 Francis Joseph de Lorraine, Duke of Alençon (1670–1675)

The young Duke was winning the approval of Louis XIV and was given the honor of being at the King's side in military reviews. Then disaster struck. Returning from a visit to the court of Charles II, king of England, he fell ill with smallpox on 18 July 1671, and died twelve days later.

The music for his funeral was composed by Marc-Antoine Charpentier. His body was carried to Joinville to be buried near his ancestors, and his heart was buried at the abbey of Montmartre.

Notes

Guise, Louis Joseph, Duc de
Guise, Louis Joseph, Duc de
Guise, Louis Joseph, Duke of
106
Counts of Eu
Louis Joseph
Princes of Joinville
Infectious disease deaths in France
French music
Princes of Lorraine
17th-century French people